The Ritz Theatre in Elizabeth, New Jersey is a performing arts center.

The Ritz was built on the site of the 1865 Drake Opera House/People's Theatre/Star Theatre/ Jacob's Theatre/Proctor's Theatre. The theatre was purchased in 1925 by Jacob Fabian, who hired architect Fred Wesley Wentworth to design the Ritz Theatre on the site, which opened on March 9, 1926 with 2,791 seats. By 1941 it was operated by Warner Bros. Circuit Management Corp. While there were performances through the 1970s, by the 1980s it was threatened with demolition. In 1989 it was purchased local philanthropists who set out to restore the theatre but ran out of funding. In 1994 purchased by George Castro, who has restored it to its 1920s grand appearance. It is a contributing property to the Mid-Town Historic District. Among the notables who have performed there are Chaka Kahn, George Burns, Harry Chapin, Jack Benny, The Marx Brother, Maya Angelou, Miles Davis, Ray Charles, and Rodney Dangerfield.

References

External links 
 

Theatres in New Jersey
Concert halls in New Jersey
1865 establishments in New Jersey
Buildings and structures in Elizabeth, New Jersey
Performing arts centers in New Jersey
Tourist attractions in Union County, New Jersey
Historic district contributing properties in New Jersey
New Jersey Register of Historic Places
Fred Wesley Wentworth buildings
Art Deco architecture in New Jersey
National Register of Historic Places in Union County, New Jersey
Theatres on the National Register of Historic Places in New Jersey